34.788%...Complete is the fifth album by My Dying Bride, released on 6 October 1998. The track "Under Your Wings and into Your Arms" appears on both The Voice of the Wretched CD and the Sinamorata DVD, and the opening track, "The Whore, the Cook and the Mother" appeared on their latest live DVD, An Ode to Woe.

The Japanese version of the album featured a bonus track, entitled "Follower". This track was also featured on the 2003 re-release digipak of the album.

The album was dedicated to the memory of Richard Jackson, father of bassist Adrian.

Album information
This is the only album by My Dying Bride to feature the drumming of Bill Law. It is also the first not to feature long-time keyboardist and violinist Martin Powell, who  became a live member of Anathema shortly afterwards, and full-time member of Cradle of Filth two years after the album was released.

The spoken word interlude during "The Whore, The Cook and The Mother" is based on the replicant interrogation method from the movie Blade Runner. Questions are asked in Cantonese and reversed, and singer Aaron Stainthorpe's replies can be heard.

The album's title was derived from a dream that guitarist Calvin Robertshaw had, he was told the human race had a limited lifespan on Earth, 34.788% of which had already expired.

Musical style
The album demonstrated a foray into a more electronic style of music, which was not generally popular with fans and was abandoned on subsequent albums.

Track listing 
 All songs published By VILE Music.

Japanese Edition

Personnel

My Dying Bride 
 Aaron Stainthorpe – vocals
 Andrew Craighan – guitars
 Calvin Robertshaw – guitars
 Adrian Jackson – bass
 Bill Law – drums

Additional personnel 
 Keith Appleton and Mags – keyboards
 Michelle Richfield – female vocals on "Heroin Chic"

Production 
 Arranged by My Dying Bride
 Produced and mixed by Mags and Calvin Robertshaw
 Engineered by Mags, with assistance from James Anderson and Stevie Clow

References 

1998 albums
My Dying Bride albums
Peaceville Records albums